Abdullah Ibn-Mohammed Al-Khalifa or Abdullah al-Khalifa or Abdallahi al-Khalifa, also known as "The Khalifa" (184625 November 1899) was a Sudanese Ansar ruler who was one of the principal followers of Muhammad Ahmad. Ahmad claimed to be the Mahdi, building up a large following. After Ahmad's death, Abdullah Ibn-Mohammed took over the movement, adopting the title of Khalifat al-Mahdi (usually rendered as "Khalifa"). He attempted to create a kingdom, which led to widespread discontent, and his eventual defeat and death at the hands of the British and Egyptians.

Personal life
Abdullah was born into the Ta'aisha Baqqara tribe circa 1846 and was trained and educated as a preacher and holy man. His father, Mahommed et Taki, had determined to emigrate to Mecca with his family, but the unsettled state of the region prevented him, and he died in Africa after advising Abdullah, to take refuge on the Nile, and to proceed to Mecca at a favourable opportunity.

On his journey, Abdullah met and became a follower of Muhammad Ahmad "the Mahdi" around 1880 and was named Khalifa by the Mahdi in 1881, becoming one of his chief lieutenants. He married Hafsa Abdelsalam; she eventually bore him a son. 

The other Khalifas were Ali wad Hilu and Muhammad Sharif. Abdullah was given command of a large part of the Mahdist army, and during the next four years led them in a series of victories over the Anglo-Egyptians.

He fought at the Battle of El Obeid, where William Hicks's Anglo-Egyptian army was destroyed (5 November 1883), and was one of the principal commanders at the siege of Khartoum, (February 188426 January 1885).

Ruler of Sudan

After the unexpected death of the Mahdi in June 1885, Abdullah succeeded as leader of the Mahdists, declaring himself "Khalifat al-Mahdi", or successor of the Mahdi. He faced internal disputes over his leadership with the Ashraf and he had to suppress several revolts in 1885–1886, 1888–1889, and 1891 before emerging as sole leader. 

At first the Mahdiyah was run on military lines as a jihad state, with the courts enforcing Sharia law and the precepts of the Mahdi, which had equal force. Later the Khalifa established a more traditional administration. Khartoum was deserted on his orders, and Omdurman, at first intended as a temporary camp, was made his capital.

He felt the best course of action to keep internal problems to a minimum was to expand into Ethiopia and Egypt. The Khalifa invaded Ethiopia with 60,000 Ansar troops and sacked Gondar in 1887, destroying nearly every church in the city. He later refused to make peace. He successfully repulsed the Ethiopians at the Battle of Metemma on 9 March 1889, where the Ethiopian emperor Yohannes IV was killed. He created workshops to maintain steam boats on the Nile and to manufacture ammunition. But the Khailfa underestimated the strength of the Anglo-Egyptian forces and suffered a crushing defeat in Egypt.

The Egyptians failed to counter up the Nile; however in the 1890s the state became strained economically, and suffered from crop failures instead. The Ashraf, in November 1891, decided to press again, but were put down one final time; they were prevented from causing any further issues. During the next four years, the Khalifa strengthened the military and financial situation of Sudan; however this was not enough, as Sudan became threatened by the Italian, French and British imperial forces that surrounded it.  In 1896, an Anglo-Egyptian army under General Herbert Kitchener began the reconquest of Sudan.

Defeat and death

Following the loss of Dongola in September 1896, then Berber and Abu Hamed to Kitchener's army in 1897, the Khalifa Abdullah sent an army that was defeated at the Battle of Atbara River on 8 April 1898, afterwards falling back to his new capital of Omdurman.

At the Battle of Omdurman on 2 September 1898, his army of 52,000 men was destroyed. The Khalifa then fled south and went into hiding with a few followers but was finally caught and killed by Sir Reginald Wingate's Egyptian column at Umm Diwaikarat in Kordofan on 25 November 1899.

Devout, intelligent, and an able general and administrator, the Khalifa was unable to overcome tribal dissension to unify Sudan, and was forced to employ Egyptians to provide the trained administrators and technicians he needed to maintain his self-proclaimed Islamist military caliphate.

See also

 Anglo-Egyptian conquest of Sudan
 Khalifa House Museum

References 

Sources

1846 births
1899 deaths
Mahdist military personnel of the Mahdist War
Sudanese politicians
19th-century monarchs in Africa